Harleston is a village and civil parish in the Mid Suffolk District of Suffolk, England, just south of the Haughley Bends on the A14. It is located between the villages of Shelland and Onehouse, about 3 miles west of Stowmarket.

Notable residents
Samantha Harvey (1993- ), musician born in the village

External links

Villages in Suffolk
Mid Suffolk District
Civil parishes in Suffolk